Hypericum sect. Adenosepalum is one of 36 sections in the genus Hypericum. Its type species is Hypericum montanum.

Distribution 
Species in the section are found primarily in Western and Central Europe, Central Russia, the Caucasus, and Morocco.

Description 
If the species in the section are woody, they will be deciduous. They will either be glabrous or have simple hairs and have dark black glands on their leaves. The leaves are placed opposite but in very rare cases are 3-whorled.

Species 

Section Adenosepalum contains thirty species divided into four subsections as well as two nothospecies. In addition, H. annulatum has three recognized subspecies and H. aethiopicum has two.
 Family Hypericaceae Juss.
 Genus Hypericum L.
Hypericum sect. Adenosepalum Spach.
subsect. Adenosepalum
H. annulatum Moris
H. annulatum subsp. afromontanum (Bullock) N. Robson
 H. annulatum subsp. annulatum
 H. annulatum subsp. intermedium (Steud. ex A.Rich.) N.Robson
 H. athoum Boiss. & Orph.
 H. atomarium Boiss.
 H. cuisinii Barbey
 H. delphicum Boiss. & Heldr.
 H. lanuginosum Lam.
H. montanum L. (Type Species)
 H. reflexum L.f.
 subsect. Aethiopica N. Robson
H. abilianum N. Robson
H. aethiopicum Thunb.
H. aethiopicum subsp. aethiopicum
 H. aethiopicum subsp. sonderi (Bredell) N. Robson
H. afrum Lam.
H. conjungens N. Robson
H. glandulosum Aiton
H. kiboënse Oliv.
 subsect. Caprifolia
 H. caprifolium Boiss.
 H. coadunatum Chr. Sm.
 H. collenetteae N. Robson
 H. naudinianum Coss. & Durieu
 H. psilophytum (Diels) Maire
 H. pubescens Boiss.
 H. scruglii Bacch., Brullo & Salmeri
 H. sinaicum Hochst. ex Boiss.
 H. somaliense N. Robson
 H. tomentosum L.
 Huber-Morathii group
 H. decaisneanum Coss. & Daveau
 H. formosissimum Takht.
 H. huber-morathii N. Robson
 H. minutum P.H.Davis & Poulter
 H. sechmenii Ocak & O.Koyuncu
 Nothospecies
 H. × joerstadii Lid
H. pubescens × tomentosum

References 

Hypericum sections